The Partenavia P.59 Jolly was an Italian two-seat  training monoplane designed by Partenavia to meet a requirement for the Aero Club  d'Italia. First fight was in  1960.

Development
The P.59 Jolly was designed to meet a requirement for a standard trainer for the Italian national flying clubs. The prototype first flew on 2 February 1960 and was a high-wing monoplane with a nose-mounted 95 hp (71 kW) Continental engine. It  had a fixed tailwheel landing gear and seated  two occupants side-by-side in an enclosed cockpit. The aircraft was later re-engined with a 100 hp (75 kW) Continental O-200 engine  and the wing span was increased. The competition was won by the Aviamilano P.19 Scricciolo  and only one Jolly was built.

Specifications

See also

References

 
 

Jolly
1960s Italian civil trainer aircraft
Single-engined tractor aircraft
High-wing aircraft
Aircraft first flown in 1960